Paul Narcisse Cyr DDS  (born 9 September 1878, died 24 August 1946), nicknamed the "Wild Bull of Jeanerette", was an American politician, dentist, banker, and geologist, who served as Lieutenant Governor of Louisiana from 1928 to 1931, unsuccessfully declared himself Governor of Louisiana, and was first an ally and then an opponent of Governor Huey Long.

Career
Cyr was a dentist, serving as president of both the Louisiana Dental Society and the Louisiana Dental Examining Board. He also co-founded the First National Bank of Jeanerette, where his daughter Emily later worked, and worked as a geologist for Humble Oil.

Politics
Cyr was chosen by Huey Long to be his running mate as Lieutenant Governor when Long ran for Governor of Louisiana in April 1928, partly because Long appreciated Cyr's muscular stature alongside him on the campaign trail and partly to secure the French-speaking vote. They fell out in 1929 after Cyr opposed Long's death sentence on Cyr's friend Thomas Dreher, who with Ada Leboeuf had been convicted of murdering her husband. In March 1930, Cyr spoke out against Long on the state senate floor, accusing him of corruption in naming his brother as a tax collector and in leasing land to a Texan oil company.

Cyr declared himself Acting Governor whenever Long was out of the state. Long was elected to the United States Senate in March 1930 when Senator Joseph Ransdell's term ended, but he refused to resign as Governor and take up his seat to avoid Cyr being appointed as his successor. Nevertheless, Cyr had himself sworn in as Governor by the clerk of Caddo Parish court in Shreveport on 14 October 1931. His term ended almost immediately: Long promptly sent in the National Guard to the Governor's mansion and the state Capitol and drove armed with a pistol from New Orleans to Baton Rouge to oversee the operation. Cyr failed to order Adjutant General Ray Fleming to stand down the National Guard and was threatened with arrest if he entered the state Capitol. Cyr sued, but the suit was dismissed in November and Long had sympathetic judges remove Cyr from both the governorship and as Lieutenant Governor, arguing that Cyr had vacated the latter post when he swore himself in as Governor: "He is no longer Lieutenant Governor, and he is now nothing". Long instead appointed state senate president Alvin O. King as Lieutenant Governor and hence his successor as Governor. Another attempt by Cyr to declare himself Governor at the Heidelberg Hotel in Baton Rouge in January 1932 also failed when he was evicted at Long's behest, and Cyr backed out of standing for Governor in the 1932 election in favor of Dudley LeBlanc, retiring from politics and returning to dentistry.

Personal life
Cyr was born in Jeanerette to the French-speaking Catholic family of Joseph C. Cyr and Emilie Julie Hoffherr. Cyr said he began learning English aged 10.

He attended Chamberlain Hunt Academy in Mississippi, Louisiana State University, then Atlanta Dental College.

He married Florence Mary McGowen on 6 February 1907 and they had two daughters and two sons, Marjorie Emily (born 1910), Emily Julie (born 1912), later Emily Cyr Bridges and owner of Albania Plantation House, Louie McGowen (born 1913), and Charles McGowen (born 1915). Cyr owned the Steamboat House in New Iberia from 1937.

References

External links
 State v. Long, Supreme Court of Louisiana, Feb 12, 1932, 140 So. 13 (La. 1932), Cyr's 1932 case against Long

1878 births
1946 deaths
Lieutenant Governors of Louisiana
American dentists
People from Jeanerette, Louisiana
American geologists
American bankers
Louisiana Creole people